USA-309, also known as GPS-III SV04 or Sacagawea, is a United States navigation satellite which forms part of the Global Positioning System. It was the fourth GPS Block III satellite to be launched.

Satellite 
SV04 is the fourth GPS Block III satellite to be launched. Launch was pushed back several times due to delays with the earlier satellites.

Launch 
USA-309 was launched by SpaceX on 5th of November 2020 at 23:24 UTC atop Falcon 9 booster B1062. The launch took place from SLC-40 of the Cape Canaveral Air Force Station, and placed USA-309 directly into semi-synchronous orbit. About eight minutes after launch, Falcon 9 B1062 successfully landed on the droneship Of Course I Still Love You.

Orbit 

References 

GPS satellites
USA satellites
SpaceX military payloads
Spacecraft launched in 2020